Simpay Net (formerly Alpha Card Services, but legally still Alpha Card Services, LLC) is a United States based company that provides card processing services, payroll, Point of sale (POS) systems, gift and  reward cards, ATM services, and merchant cash advances to smaller businesses in a wide variety of industries in the United States.

The firm is a registered as an Independent Sales Organization and Merchant Services Provider (ISO/MSP) with Wells Fargo Bank.

Founded in 2000, Simpay is headquartered in Trevose, Pennsylvania, with a satellite office in Rocklin, CA.  In addition to its staff, the firm partners with independent resellers, agents, and other ISOs around the country who sell the product line to local merchants, businesses, and professional firms.

History
Alpha Card Services was founded by Lazaros Kalemis and Dimitrios Tsikoudis in October 2000 in Philadelphia, Pennsylvania. In 2005, the company moved to a larger location in Huntingdon Valley, Pennsylvania.

In May 2006, Alpha Card Services added its first new service line – Alpha ATM Services; in 2011 it added POS Services and Payroll Services. These services include card processing and merchant cash advances. 

Alpha Card Services was listed as one of Inc. Magazine’s 500 fastest-growing privately held companies in the United States for three years. 2007 (#99), 2008 (#292), 2009 (#416)

December 2012, the firm acquired Comstat Payroll, based in St Louis, MO.

In June 2013, the company moved its headquarters to its current facility in Trevose, PA.

In October 2017, the company rebranded itself to the marketplace as Simpay.

References

External links
Simpay (formerly Alpha Card Services) website
Visa service providers - Registered ISOs

Companies based in Bucks County, Pennsylvania
American companies established in 2000
Credit cards
Mobile payments
Financial services companies of the United States
Point of sale companies
Payroll